The Macchi M.39 was a racing seaplane designed and built by the Italian aircraft company Aeronautica Macchi in 1925–26. An M.39 piloted by Major Mario de Bernardi (1893–1959) won the 1926 Schneider Trophy, and the type also set world speed records that year.

Design and development
The M.39 was designed by Mario Castoldi to represent Italy in the 1926 Schneider Trophy competition, and was the first low-wing monoplane that he designed for Macchi. It was a single-seat twin-float seaplane of mixed (metal and wooden) construction. The wooden wings were wire-braced, with two-thirds of the upper surfaces used as low drag surface radiators. The pilot sat in an open cockpit above the trailing edge of the wing; the cockpits windscreen was profiled into the fuselage decking to reduce aerodynamic drag. The floats carried fuel.

The M.39 had features specializing it for Schneider Trophy competition. The course circuit required left turns, so the left wing had a slightly greater span than the right wing to allow the aircraft to make tighter left-hand turns. To counteract propeller torque reaction, the floats had unequal buoyancy.

Macchi built two versions of the M.39, a trainer version and a racer. The trainer version had an increased wingspan of 10.23 metres (33ft 7in) -compared to the 9.26m (30ft 4.5in) of the racers- and was powered by a 447-kilowatt (600-horsepower) Fiat AS.2 liquid-cooled V12 engine, while the racing version had a 597-kilowatt (800-horsepower) Fiat AS.2. Macchi built two trainers, three racers, and one non-flying static-test airframe. The first M.39, a trainer with serial number MM.72, was built in only a few months. It was soon followed by the second trainer (MM.73), the three racers (MM.74, MM.75, and MM.76), and the static-test airframe.

Operational history
The first M.39 to fly was the trainer MM.72, which made its first flight on 6 July 1926. On 16 September 1926, the Italian Schneider team captain stalled one of the trainers over Lake Varese, crashed into the lake, and was killed, but development of the M.39 continued.

On 13 November 1926, the three M.39 racers took part in the 1926 Schneider Trophy contest at Hampton Roads, Virginia, in the United States. MM.74, flown by Adriano Bacula, came third.

Castoldi based the design of his next racing seaplane, the Macchi M.52, on that of the M.39.

Surviving aircraft
MM76, the aircraft flown by de Bernadi to win the Schneider contest and gain the world speed record, is on display in the Museo Storico Aeronautica Militare  in Bracciano.

Operators

Regia Aeronautica

Specifications (M.39 racer)

See also

Notes

Bibliography
 Angelucci, Enzo. World Encyclopedia of Civil Aircraft. London: Willow Books, 1984. .
 Donald, David, ed. The Complete Encyclopedia of World Aircraft. New York: Barnes & Noble Books, 1997. .
 Eves, Edward  The Schneider Trophy Story. Shrewsbury, UK. Airlife Publishing Ltd., 2001. .
James, Derek  Schneider Trophy Aircraft''. London:  Putnam, 1981. ISBN 0370303288

External links

Newsreel footage of Macchi M.39 MM.76 and Major Mario de Bernardi after winning the 1926 Schneider Trophy race 

Schneider Trophy
Floatplanes
1920s Italian experimental aircraft
Racing aircraft
M.39
Low-wing aircraft
Single-engined tractor aircraft
Aircraft first flown in 1926